Presidential elections were held in Sri Lanka on 21 December 1999. Nominations were accepted on 16 November 1999 and electoral participation was 73.31%. Incumbent President Chandrika Kumaratunga of the governing People's Alliance was re-elected for a second term, receiving 51% of all votes cast.

Background
Sri Lankan presidents are elected for six-year terms; with the previous election having taken place in 1994, an election normally would not have been held until 2000. Kumaratunga called the election early.

Kumaratunga campaigned to continue her actions against the Tamil Tigers, while her main opponent Ranil Wickremasinghe called for the commencement of direct negotiations with the Tigers.

Three days before the election, Kumaratunga was nearly killed by a Tamil Tiger assassination attempt at her final rally.  She lost her right eye, and appeared heavily bandaged on television before the election.

Results

References

 
Presidential elections in Sri Lanka
Sri Lanka
1999 in Sri Lanka
Sri Lanka
Ranil Wickremesinghe